The following is an alphabetical list of topics related to the Federation of Saint Kitts and Nevis.

0–9 

.kn – Internet country code top-level domain for Saint Kitts and Nevis

A
Americas
North America
North Atlantic Ocean
West Indies
Caribbean Sea
Antilles
Lesser Antilles
Islands of Saint Kitts and Nevis
Anglo-America
Antilles
Atlas of Saint Kitts and Nevis
Attorney General of Saint Kitts and Nevis

B
Basseterre on Saint Kitts – Capital of Saint Kitts and Nevis

C
Capital of Saint Kitts and Nevis:  Basseterre on Saint Kitts
Caribbean
Caribbean Community (CARICOM)
Caribbean Sea
Categories:
:Category:Saint Kitts and Nevis
:Category:Buildings and structures in Saint Kitts and Nevis
:Category:Communications in Saint Kitts and Nevis
:Category:Economy of Saint Kitts and Nevis
:Category:Education in Saint Kitts and Nevis
:Category:Environment of Saint Kitts and Nevis
:Category:Geography of Saint Kitts and Nevis
:Category:Government of Saint Kitts and Nevis
:Category:History of Saint Kitts and Nevis

:Category:Saint Kitts and Nevis culture
:Category:Military of Saint Kitts and Nevis
:Category:Politics of Saint Kitts and Nevis
:Category:Saint Kitts and Nevis people
:Category:Saint Kitts and Nevis stubs
:Category:Saint Kitts and Nevis-related lists
:Category:Society of Saint Kitts and Nevis
:Category:Sport in Saint Kitts and Nevis
:Category:Transport in Saint Kitts and Nevis
commons:Category:Saint Kitts and Nevis
Christena disaster
Coat of arms of Saint Kitts and Nevis
Commonwealth of Nations
Commonwealth realm of Saint Kitts and Nevis
Communications in Saint Kitts and Nevis
Constitution of Saint Kitts and Nevis

D
Demographics of Saint Kitts and Nevis

E
Economy of Saint Kitts and Nevis
English colonization of the Americas
English language

F

Federation of Saint Kitts and Nevis
Flag of Saint Kitts and Nevis
Foreign relations of Saint Kitts and Nevis

G
Geography of Saint Kitts and Nevis

H
History of Saint Kitts and Nevis

I
International Organization for Standardization (ISO)
ISO 3166-1 alpha-2 country code for Saint Kitts and Nevis: KN
ISO 3166-1 alpha-3 country code for Saint Kitts and Nevis: KNA
ISO 3166-2:KN region codes for Saint Kitts and Nevis
Islands of Saint Kitts and Nevis:
Saint Kitts (Saint Christopher Island)
Nevis island
Booby Island (Saint Kitts and Nevis)
Crokus Cay
Dalzel Island
Dodan Island
Dulcina Island
East Cay
Eden Island
Fahie Island
Friars Island (Saint Kitts and Nevis)
Gardner Island (Saint Kitts and Nevis)
Garvey Island
Golden Cay
Jessop Island
Maddens
Meves Island
Otters Island
Sugar Loaf (Saint Kitts and Nevis)
Vambelle Island

L
Lists related to Saint Kitts and Nevis:
Diplomatic missions of Saint Kitts and Nevis
LGBT rights in Saint Kitts and Nevis (Gay rights)
List of cities in Saint Kitts and Nevis
List of islands of Saint Kitts and Nevis
List of diplomatic missions in Saint Kitts and Nevis
List of rivers of Saint Kitts and Nevis
List of Saint Kitts and Nevis-related topics
Topic outline of Saint Kitts and Nevis

M
Military of Saint Kitts and Nevis
Monarchy of Saint Kitts and Nevis
Music of Saint Kitts and Nevis

O
Organisation of Eastern Caribbean States (OECS)

P
Politics of Saint Kitts and Nevis

R
Religion in Saint Kitts and Nevis
Rugby union in Saint Kitts and Nevis

S
Saint Kitts and Nevis
Saint Kitts Creole language
The Scout Association of Saint Kitts and Nevis
States headed by Elizabeth II

T
Topic outline of Saint Kitts and Nevis
Transport in Saint Kitts and Nevis

U
United Nations, member state since 1983

W

Wikipedia:WikiProject Topic outline/Drafts/Topic outline of Saint Kitts and Nevis

See also

Commonwealth of Nations
List of Caribbean-related topics
List of international rankings
Lists of country-related topics
Topic outline of geography
Topic outline of North America
Topic outline of Saint Kitts and Nevis
United Nations

References

External links

 
Saint Kitts and Nevis